Tadeusz Zastawniak (29 August 1907 – 16 February 1956) was a Polish footballer. He played in eight matches for the Poland national football team from 1925 to 1928.

References

External links
 

1907 births
1956 deaths
Polish footballers
Poland international footballers
Association footballers not categorized by position